Hin Stuttligi Flokkurin (English: The Funny Party) was a joke political party in the Faroe Islands. It was founded in 2004 by the current party leader, Johan Dalsgaard, also known as Johan í Kollafirði and later as Johan í Fámará. The party is based upon political satire. Dalsgaard was mainly inspired by Jacob Haugaard, who pulled a similar prank in the Danish parliament. Johan Dalsgaard was not the only candidate on the list. Rubek Lilaa was the candidate for Eysturoyar Valdømi. At that time the Faroe Islands had 7 districts, so people could only vote for a candidate from their own district (valdømi). Hin stuttliga Flokkurin had two candidates, Johan Dalsgaard was candidate for the South Streymoy district (Suðurstreymoyar valdømi) and Rubek Lilaa was candidate in Eysturoy. The party had no other candidates.

The party got 747 votes in the Faroese parliament election in 2004. Hin Stuttligi Flokkurin is currently not represented in any Faroese local governments.

See also 

 Monster Raving Looney Party 
 List of frivolous political parties

References 

Joke political parties
Defunct political parties in the Faroe Islands